George Fitzmaurice (13 February 1885 – 13 June 1940) was a French-born film director and producer.

Career

Fitzmaurice's career first started as a set designer on stage. Beginning in 1914, and continuing until his death in 1940, he directed a total of over 80 films; several of these were successful, including The Son of the Sheik, Raffles, Mata Hari, and Suzy.

At the beginning of his directorial career, Fitzmaurice was astute at directing stage actresses in their initial films with the first wave of great Broadway stars that migrated to motion pictures during the World War I era, including Mae Murray, Elsie Ferguson, Fannie Ward, Helene Chadwick, Irene Fenwick, Gail Kane, and Edna Goodrich.

The Son of the Sheik is his most famous extant silent film, no doubt aided by the sudden death of its star, Rudolph Valentino. Lilac Time is a classic war/romance film. Fitzmaurice, however, directed scores of silent films of which the majority of them are lost to the ravages of decomposition. Recent discoveries in Gosfilmofond in Russia include 1919's Witness for the Defense with Elsie Ferguson and 1922's Kick In with Bert Lytell. A restoration of his 1928 part-talkie hybrid The Barker is winning praise from many film buffs. Rumors of other Fitzmaurice films in Gosfilmofond include 1920s Idols of Clay (with Mae Murray) and Three Live Ghosts with Norman Kerry, Anna Q. Nilsson, Cyril Chadwick, and Edmund Goulding.

Personal life

He was married at one time to Ouida Bergere, later the wife of Basil Rathbone. His second wife was Diana Kane, a sister of actress Lois Wilson. With Kane, he had two daughters Sheila Fitzmaurice born in 1929, and Patricia Fitzmaurice Baxter born in 1931.

Filmography

Director

 When Rome Ruled (1914)
 Stop Thief! (1915)
 The Commuters (1915)
 At Bay (1915)
 Who's Who in Society (1915)
 Via Wireless (1915)
 The Money Master (1915)
 The Test (1916)
 Big Jim Garrity (1916)
 New York (1916)
 Arms and the Woman (1916)
 The Romantic Journey (1916)
 Kick In (1917)
 The Hunting of the Hawk (1917)
 The Recoil (1917)
 The Iron Heart (1917)
 Blind Man's Luck (1917)
 The On-the-Square Girl (1917)
 The Mark of Cain (1917)
 Sylvia of the Secret Service (1917)
 Innocent (1918)
 The Naulahka (1918)
 The Hillcrest Mystery (1918)
 A Japanese Nightingale (1918)
 The Narrow Path (1918)
 Common Clay (1919)
 The Cry of the Weak (1919)
 The Profiteers (1919)
 The Avalanche (1919)
 Our Better Selves (1919)
 A Society Exile (1919)
 Witness for the Defense (1919)
 Counterfeit (1919)
 On With the Dance (1920)
 Right to Love (1920)
 Idols of Clay (1920)
 Paying the Piper (1921)
 Experience (1921)
 Forever (1921)
 Three Live Ghosts (1922)
 The Man from Home (1922)
 Kick In (1922) 
 To Have and to Hold (1922)
 The Cheat (1923)
 Bella Donna (1923)
 The Eternal City (1923)
 Cytherea (1924)
 Tarnish (1924)
 A Thief in Paradise (1925)
 His Supreme Moment (1925)
 The Dark Angel (1925)
 The Son of the Sheik (1926)
 The Night of Love (1927)
 The Tender Hour (1927)
 Rose of the Golden West (1927)
 The Love Mart (1927)
 Lilac Time (1928)
 The Barker (1928)
 His Captive Woman (1929)
 Tiger Rose (1929)
 The Man and the Moment (1929)
 The Locked Door (1929)
 The Bad One (1930)
 Raffles (1930)
 The Devil to Pay! (1930)
 One Heavenly Night (1931)
 Strangers May Kiss (1931) uncredited
 The Unholy Garden (1931)
 Mata Hari (1931)
 As You Desire Me (1932) uncredited
 Rockabye (1932) uncredited
 Nana (1934)
 All Men Are Enemies (1934)
 Petticoat Fever (1936)
 Suzy (1936)
 The Last of Mrs. Cheyney (1937)
 The Emperor's Candlesticks (1937)
 Live, Love and Learn (1937)
 Arsène Lupin Returns (1938)
 Vacation from Love (1938)
 Adventure in Diamonds (1940)

Actor
 The Avalanche (1919) - (uncredited)
 Ben-Hur (1925) - Chariot Race Spectator (uncredited) (final film role)

References

External links

 
 
 George Fitzmaurice at Virtual History
 Some production stills with George Fitzmaurice, cast and crews

1885 births
1940 deaths
People from Greater Los Angeles
French emigrants to the United States
Film directors from California
Burials at Forest Lawn Memorial Park (Glendale)